The Nymphalinae are a subfamily of brush-footed butterflies (family Nymphalidae). Sometimes, the subfamilies Limenitidinae, and Biblidinae are included here as subordinate tribe(s), while the tribe Melitaeini is occasionally regarded as a distinct subfamily.

Systematics
The traditionally recognized tribes of Nymphalinae are here listed in the presumed phylogenetic sequence:

 Coeini (six or seven genera)
 Nymphalini – anglewings, tortoiseshells and relatives (about 15 genera, two are fossil)
 Kallimini (about five genera)
 Victorinini (four genera, formerly in Kallimini)
 Junoniini (about five genera)
 Melitaeini – fritillaries (about 25 genera)

Genera incertae sedis are:
 Rhinopalpa – the wizard
 Kallimoides Shirôzu & Nakanishi, 1984 – African leaf butterfly

 Vanessula Dewitz, 1887

In addition to these, Crenidomimas is sometimes placed here, but may belong in the Limenitidinae, genus Euryphura.

The Late Eocene fossil genus Lithodryas might belong here, but it is generally assigned to the Lycaenidae.

References

Further reading
 Savela, Markku (2010): Markku Savela's Lepidoptera and some other life forms – Nymphalinae. Version of 2010-JUN-30. Retrieved 2011-FEB-08.
 Glassberg, Jeffrey Butterflies through Binoculars, The West (2001)
 Pelham, Jonathan Catalogue of the Butterflies of the United States and Canada (2008)

External links

 Butterflies and Moths of North America
 Butterflies of America

 
Taxa named by William John Swainson
Butterfly subfamilies
-